St. Anthony's School and variants may refer to:

Guam
St. Anthony Catholic School, Tamuning GU

India
 St. Anthony's Senior Secondary school, New Delhi
 St. Anthony's School, Ranchi
 St. Anthony’s Higher Secondary School, Shillong
 St. Anthony's Senior Secondary School, Barabanki
 St. Anthony's Senior Secondary School, Udaipur
 St. Anthony's High School (Assolna)

Malaysia
St. Anthony's School, Teluk Intan

Pakistan
St. Anthony High School, Lahore

Singapore
Saint Anthony's Canossian Secondary School, Bedok, Singapore
Saint Anthony's Primary School, Bukit Batok, Singapore

Sri Lanka
St. Anthony's College, Kandy

United Kingdom
St. Anthony's School, Hampstead, London, England
St. Anthony's Primary School, Craigavon, County Armagh, Northern Ireland

United States
St. Anthony High School (California)
St. Anthony School (Florida)
St. Anthony High School (Wailuku, Hawaii)
St. Anthony High School (Illinois)
St. Anthony's Roman Catholic Church, Rectory, Convent, and School, Louisville, Kentucky, listed on the National Register of Historic Places (NRHP)
St. Anthony High School (Milwaukee), Wisconsin
St. Anthony Village High School, Minnesota
St. Anthony's Church and School (Cedar Rapids, Nebraska), NRHP-listed
St. Anthony High School (New Jersey)
St. Anthony's High School (South Huntington, New York)
St. Anthony Catholic High School, Texas

See also
St Anthony's Girls' Catholic Academy
St Anthony's College (disambiguation)
Saint Anthony (disambiguation)